Swarovski Kristallwelten (Crystal Worlds) is an experience attraction created by André Heller for the crystal glass manufacturer Swarovski, consisting of a park, art museum, retail area, and restaurant. It opened in 1995 and is located in the Austrian Tyrol, in the town of Wattens, Innsbruck-Land District, where the company was founded and still has its headquarters today. Kristallwelten, together with the Swarovski Kristallwelten Store in Innsbruck and Vienna, form D. Swarovski Tourism Services GmbH.

History 
The Swarovski company was founded by Daniel Swarovski in 1895. One century later, multimedia artist Andre Heller was commissioned to design the museum with 14 chambers of wonder in the form of a giant to celebrate the 100th anniversary of D. Swarovski KG. After the initial opening in 1995, further expansion and renovation projects followed in 1998, 2003, and 2007.

Expansion in 2014/15 

In October 2014, the renovation and expansion of Swarovski Kristallwelten began, at a cost of around 34 million euros, to celebrate the 120th anniversary of the Swarovski company, and the 20th anniversary of Swarovski Kristallwelten itself. It reopened on April 30, 2015. The overall area of the attraction was extended from 3.5 hectares to 7.5 hectares. New features added to the garden during this expansion included the "Crystal Cloud" made up of 800,000 crystals, a playtower, and the restaurant, Daniels Kristallwelten.

Chambers of Wonder
Inside the Giant there are exhibition spaces, based on the concept of the historic chambers of art and curiosities favored by aristocratic families in the 16th century. In the Chambers of Wonder at Swarovski Kristallwelten, internationally and nationally recognized artists, designers, and architects, such as Brian Eno, Tord Boontje, Niki de Saint Phalle, Jim Whiting, Keith Haring, Andy Warhol, Salvador Dalí, and Yayoi Kusama, have interpreted crystal in their own ways. 18 show rooms were created, each of which has a different thematic focus.

Attractions

 18 Chambers of Wonder
 One of the largest Swarovski Stores in the world
 Garden landscape
 Crystal Cloud with 800,000 hand-mounted crystals
 Playtower and open-air playground
 Carousel
 Daniels Kristallwelten restaurant

The Garden 
 
The garden of the Giant contains contemporary art as well as ancient history and unique pleasures. Working in collaboration with artists from throughout the globe and internationally renowned architects, a park landscape emerged on 7.5 hectares of land surrounding the iconic Giant, with unparalleled art installations and new structures.

Carousel 
Spanish designer Jaime Hayon has designed a striking black-and-white carousel to juxtapose with the greenery of the Garden within Kristallwelten. The contemporary design reimagines the traditional carousel while retaining its nostalgic appeal.

The monochrome design is made of 15 million Swarovski crystals across 12 ceiling panels and 16 wall panels and is illuminated with warm lighting.

Roman Artifacts 

Swarovski Kristallwelten (Swarovski Crystal Worlds) has acquired a new historical asset: Starting right now, the Roman Excavations are open to the public, allowing visitors to literally open a window on the past. In the course of the extensive reconstruction work carried out in 2014, wall remains dating back to Roman times were discovered, together with an important cache of coins.

In the view of the archaeologists who made the discovery, the wall remains were from a Roman country estate or a small settlement on the Roman road leading through the Lower Inn Valley. Particularly remarkable was, in addition, the discovery of a treasure consisting of 702 Roman silver coins, known as “Antoninians”. Just like the masonry, they resurfaced after almost two thousand years under the ground.

Crystal Cloud 
 
The crowning piece of the new garden is the Crystal Cloud, created by Andy Cao and Xavier Perrot. With a surface of around 1,400 square meters, this mystical masterpiece is the largest work of its kind in the world. The Crystal Cloud consists of around 800,000 hand-mounted Swarovski crystals.  This monumental installation drifts above the black Mirror Pool.

Play Tower 
The playtower fosters the widest range of play experiences on four different levels arranged on top of each other. The levels are connected by a unique vertical net that can be climbed up to a height of just over 14 meters. It offers the most varied activities from climbing, rocking, and swinging to sliding and even to what looks like floating. The facades of the tower, designed by architecture firm Snøhetta, consist of 160 crystalline facets, though no two are exactly alike.

Labyrinth 
One of the most beautiful parts of the park landscape is the green labyrinth in the form of a hand by André Heller that invites the visitor to explore and play hide-and-seek.

Events
In 2019, "Music in the Giant" – a festival of chamber music under the artistic direction of Thomas Larcher – took place for the 15th time. Other events include family days, workshops for children and young people, and culinary events.

Visitors
In 2011, Swarovski Kristallwelten was ranked eighth amongst the most popular tourist attractions in Austria, with 680,000 visitors, ahead of locations such as the Imperial Apartments at the Hofburg, and the Albertina art gallery in Vienna. 
Analyzed by country of origin, in 2009 the majority of visitors came from Germany (26%), followed by Austria (13%), Italy (11%), India (8%), and China (5%).
In 2019, the total number of visitors to Swarovski Kristallwelten reached 15 million.

References

External links 

Museums in Tyrol (state)
Glass museums and galleries
Museums established in 1995
Art museums and galleries in Austria
Sculpture gardens, trails and parks in Europe
Innsbruck-Land District